Weenix, Wenix, Weeninx is a surname. Notable people with the surname include:

Jan Baptist Weenix (1621–1660), Dutch painter
Jan Weenix (1640–1719), Dutch painter, son of Jan Baptist
Maria Weenix (1697–1774), Dutch painter, daughter of Jan

Dutch-language surnames